Right Reverend Jerome Emilianuspillai (20 July 1901 – 17 July 1972) was a Ceylon Tamil priest and Roman Catholic Bishop of Jaffna.

Early life and family
Emilianuspillai was born on 20 July 1901 in Wennappuwa in western Ceylon. His father was a teacher in Wennappuwa. He was educated at St Patrick's College, Jaffna.

Career
Emilianuspillai was ordained as a priest in July 1929. In July 1950 he became Bishop of Jaffna. He was the first Tamil Catholic bishop of Ceylon.

He inspired everyone to pray with trust and deep conviction. His sermons which reflected his profound faith were simple and clear and touched the heart of hearers. 

He visited the priests often,especially those who worked in far-off and difficult missions. He took much interest in the spiritual  and material well being of all Religious Congregations. He closely followed their growth and ongoing formation, helping and encouraging them.  

Emilianuspillai died on 17 July 1972.

References

1901 births
1972 deaths
Alumni of St. Patrick's College, Jaffna
Roman Catholic bishops of Jaffna
People from British Ceylon
20th-century Roman Catholic bishops in Sri Lanka